The Colomi bus crash took place on 2 March 2021, when a bus traveling along Route 7 between the departments of Cochabamba and Santa Cruz, fell into an abyss, the accident caused 21 deaths and 17 injuries. The bus was carrying students from the Universidad Pública de El Alto, which had suffered another tragedy that same day, when a balcony collapsed at the college during a protest.

Accident
The accident took place at kilometer 72 of Route 7, the precipice where the tragedy happened was 150 meters. The incident took place at 1 in the morning, in the area of Cañadón in Colomi, near Ivirgarzama. Trans Carrasco was the company that owned the bus.

Rescue
The Bolivian Air Force was the one that came to rescue the dead and wounded, the Bolivian National Police also came to provide support. The wounded were transferred to health centers in Colomi, Sacaba and Cochabamba.
Colonel Helsner Torrico Valdez of the Bolivian police reported that 20 people have died and approximately 13 injured people have to mourn. Among the survivors was Bolivian aviation technician Erwin Tumiri, who in 2016 also survived LaMia Flight 2933.   Later the government forces identified that there were 45 passengers, and the number of deaths rose to 21.1 2 and the number of wounded to 17.

See also
 List of traffic collisions (2000–present)

References

2021 disasters in Bolivia
2021 in Bolivia
2021 road incidents
2020s road incidents in South America
Bus incidents in South America
Cochabamba Department
March 2021 events in South America
Road incidents in Bolivia